NGC 278 is an isolated spiral galaxy in the northern circumpolar constellation of Cassiopeia, near the southern constellation boundary with Andromeda. The galaxy was discovered on December 11, 1786 by German-born astronomer William Herschel. J. L. E. Dreyer described it as, "considerably bright, pretty large, round, 2 stars of 10th magnitude near".

The morphological classification of this galaxy is SAB(rs)b, which indicates a weak bar structure around the nucleus (SAB), an incomplete ring around the bar (rs), and moderately-tightly wound spiral arms (b). However, the neutral hydrogen in the galaxy is spread over a diameter five times larger than its visible size.

Although it appears nearly face-on, the galactic plane is inclined by an angle of 28° to the line of sight from the Earth, with the major axis being oriented along a position angle of 116°. The outer part of the disk appears to be warped, so that the major axis is not quite perpendicular to the minor axis, and the morphology is somewhat disrupted. The inner disk contains multiple intense star-forming regions. This is taking place in an inner ring with a radius of  that may have been triggered by a merger with a smaller companion. It has an H II nucleus.

References

External links 
 

Intermediate spiral galaxies
Cassiopeia (constellation)
0278
00528
03051
17861211